The ten stages of genocide is an academic tool and a policy model which was created by Gregory Stanton, the founding president of Genocide Watch, in order to explain how genocides occur. The stages of genocide are not linear, and as a result, several of them may occur simultaneously and they can only be stopped by international intervention, based on intervention measures which meet the USAID's requirements for intervention. Stanton's stages are a conceptual model with no real-world sampling for analyzing the events and processes that lead to genocides, and they are also a model for determining preventative measures.

In 1996, Stanton presented a briefing paper called "The 8 Stages of Genocide" to the United States Department of State. In the paper, he suggested that genocides occur in eight stages that are "predictable but not inexorable". He presented it shortly after the Rwandan genocide, and it analyzed the Holocaust, the Cambodian genocide, and other genocides. The suggested intervention measures were ones that the United States government and NATO could implement or influence other European nations to implement including military invasion.

Stanton first conceived and published the model in the 1987 Faulds Lecture at Warren Wilson College, also presented to the American Anthropological Association in 1987. In 2012, he added two additional stages, discrimination and persecution. 

Stanton's model is widely used in the teaching of comparative genocide studies in a variety of settings, ranging from university courses to museum education, settings which include the Dallas Holocaust and Human Rights Museum.

Ten stages

Analysis
Other genocide scholars have focused on the cultural and political conditions that lead to genocides. Sociologist Helen Fein showed that pre-existing antisemitism was correlated with the percentage of Jews who were killed in European countries during the Holocaust. Political scientists such as Dr. Barbara Harff have identified political characteristics of states that statistically correlate with risk of genocide: prior genocides with impunity, political upheaval, exclusionary ideology, autocracy, closed borders, and massive violations of human rights.

Stanton's model places the risk factors in Harff's analysis into a processual structure. For instance:

 Political instability is a characteristic of what Leo Kuper called "divided societies" with deep rifts, as in classification.
 Naming and identifying members of the group occurs through symbolization.
 Groups targeted by the state are victims of discrimination.
 An exclusionary ideology is central to dehumanization.
 Autocratic regimes foster the organization of hate groups.
 An ethnically polarized elite is characteristic of polarization.
 Lack of openness to trade and other influences from outside a state's borders is characteristic of preparation.
 Massive violations of human rights are examples of persecution.
 Extermination of the group in whole or in part legally constitutes Genocide.
 Impunity after previous genocides is evidence of denial.

Stanton has suggested that "ultimately, the best antidote to genocide is popular education and the development of social and cultural tolerance for diversity."

See also 
Genocide education
Genocide prevention
Genocide studies
Anne Frank Human Rights Memorial
Holodomor Genocide Memorial
Psychology of genocide
United States Holocaust Memorial Museum
Yad Vashem

References

Notes

Genocide education
Stage theories